Gary Evan Crosby (June 27, 1933 – August 24, 1995) was an American actor and singer. His parents were Bing Crosby, of whom he wrote a highly critical memoir, and the singer and actress Dixie Lee.

Biography
Gary Crosby was born in Los Angeles, California, and graduated from Stanford University. He entered the entertainment business and performed in a harmony singing group, The Crosby Boys, with his three brothers, Philip, Lindsay, and Dennis, during the 1940s, 1950s, and 1960s. As a teenager, he duetted with his father on two songs, "Sam's Song" and "Play a Simple Melody", which became the first double-sided gold record in history. He also recorded duets with Louis Armstrong and at least one 45-single with Sammy Davis Jr. He also performed on several variety programs, including  ABC's The Pat Boone Chevy Showroom and NBC's The Ford Show, Starring Tennessee Ernie Ford.

Radio star
In the mid-1950s, he had his own radio program, the Gary Crosby Show on CBS. The musical variety program debuted June 6, 1954, as a summer replacement for Bing Crosby's show.

Actor
As an actor, Crosby appeared in many television programs.  On March 20, 1955, he appeared on The Jack Benny Program  Season 5, Episode 13. Later, he was briefly under contract to 20th Century-Fox in the late 1950s. He appeared in a number of supporting roles for the studio, normally comedies in which Crosby played a soldier: Mardi Gras (1958) with Pat Boone; Holiday for Lovers (1959), as Carol Lynley's love interest; A Private's Affair (1959), with Sal Mineo; The Right Approach (1961) with Frankie Vaughan.

He is perhaps best-remembered for his recurring roles as Eddie the scheming bellhop on The Bill Dana Show and Officer Edward "Ed" Wells on NBC's Adam-12 from 1968 to 1975, as well as appearances on several other shows produced by Jack Webb's Mark VII Limited (including an episode of Dragnet 1969 and five episodes of Emergency!). In addition to the aforementioned, he also appeared in three episodes of The Rockford Files. Crosby appeared in, In The Heat Of The Night, as Mal Tabert, in When The Music Stopped, as manager of Robert Goulet, who shoots and kills a stalker in 1992.

In 1965, he made a guest appearance on Perry Mason as singer Jazbo Williams in "The Case of the Frustrated Folk Singer". He appeared in Girl Happy (1965), starring Elvis Presley, with whom he had been stationed in the Army in Germany.

In 1964, Crosby appeared in the last filmed episode of The Twilight Zone.  Entitled "Come Wander with Me", the episode co-starred Bonnie Beecher (in her very first role) and was directed by Richard Donner.

Gary also made an appearance in his father's 1964 sitcom, The Bing Crosby Show in the second episode as a lookalike. In the 1970s, he appeared occasionally on game shows such as Match Game and Tattletales as a guest panelist. He married and divorced three times; he had one stepchild as a result.

Memoir
In 1983, six years after his father's death, Crosby published an autobiography, Going My Own Way, which revealed the effects of his alcoholism and his difficult childhood as a result of his mother's alcoholism and his father's emotional and physical abuse.

Shortly before Gary's book was actually published, Lindsay said, "I'm glad [Gary] did it. I hope it clears up a lot of the old lies and rumors." Unlike Gary, Lindsay stated that he preferred to remember "all the good things I did with my dad and forget the times that were rough".

Bing's younger brother, singer and jazz bandleader Bob Crosby, recalled at the time of Gary's revelations that Bing was a "disciplinarian", as their mother and father had been. He added, "We were brought up that way." In an interview for the same article, Gary clarified that Bing "was like a lot of fathers of that time. He was not out to be vicious, to beat children for his kicks."

The author of the most recent biography on Bing Crosby, Gary Giddins, said that Gary Crosby's memoir is not reliable on many instances and cannot be trusted on the abuse stories.

Gary Crosby's adopted son, Steven, stated in a 2003 interview:

Death
Gary Crosby died of lung cancer in Burbank, California in 1995, and is interred at Forest Lawn-Hollywood Hills Cemetery.

Family relations
 Brother of Phillip and Dennis (twins) and Lindsay Crosby
 Half-brother of Harry Crosby, Nathaniel Crosby and Mary Crosby
 Nephew of the bandleader Bob Crosby
 Cousin of Chris Crosby
 Uncle of Denise Crosby

FilmographyMardi Gras (1958)Holiday for Lovers (1959)A Private's Affair (1959)The Right Approach (1961)Two Tickets to Paris (1962)Operation Bikini (1963)The Twilight Zone, "Come Wander with Me" (1964)Girl Happy (1965)Perry Mason, "The Case of The Frustrated Folk Singer" (1965)Mayberry RFD, "The Moon Rocks" (1971)Adam-12, various episodesEmergency!, various episodesThe Bionic Woman, "Bionic Beauty" (1976)Wonder Woman, "Light-Fingered Lady" (1978)Vega$, (1980)Project U.F.O. Hunter, various episodesThe Night Stalker (1987)The Flying Nun'', Season 3 Episode 3 
(1969)

Bibliography

References

External links

1933 births
1995 deaths
American male television actors
American people of English descent
American people of Irish descent
Deaths from lung cancer in California
Burials at Forest Lawn Memorial Park (Hollywood Hills)
20th-century American male actors
20th-century American singers
Male actors from Los Angeles
Singers from Los Angeles
20th-century American memoirists
Bing Crosby
American male film actors
20th-century American male singers